The Walls of Time is the fourth solo album by country rock / bluegrass musician Peter Rowan. The album contains a solid set of mostly bluegrass compositions. Guest musicians include Jerry Douglas, Ricky Skaggs, Sam Bush, Tony Trischka, and Peter's brother Lorin Rowan.

The tracks "Old, Old House", "Hiroshima Mon Amour," and "Willow Garden," all originally released on Peter Rowan with The Red Hot Pickers, were added to the 1993 CD re-release, presumably to fill out the play time to encourage sales of the CD. These tracks, added to the CD where the A-side on the LP ended, are not strictly part of the album.

Track listing
"Roving Gambler"  (Traditional) - 2:43
"Lone Pilgrim"  (Traditional) - 2:53
"Raglan Road (Dawning of the Day)"  (P.Kavanagh/K.Kavanagh) - 3:40
"Going Up on the Mountain"  (Traditional) - 2:48
"Casey's Last Ride"  (Kris Kristofferson) - 4:05
"Old, Old House"  (George Jones/Hal Bynum) - 3:12 (**)
"Hiroshima Mon Amour"  (Peter Rowan) - 3:39 (**)
"Willow Garden"  (Traditional) - 2:48 (**)
"Moonshiner"  (Traditional) - 2:57
"Thirsty in the Rain"  (Peter Rowan) - 3:04
"Walls of Time"  (Peter Rowan/Bill Monroe) - 4:27
"Plains of Waterloo"  (Traditional) - 7:10

(**) Denotes Bonus Tracks included on 1993 CD release.

Personnel
Peter Rowan - guitar, mandolin, lead vocals
Ricky Skaggs - mandolin, violin, mandola, tenor vocals
Sam Bush - fiddle, violin, mandolin
Lorin Rowan - guitar, piano, harmony vocals
Jerry Douglas - dobro
Tony Trischka - banjo
Roger Mason - bass
Richard Greene - fiddle, violin, mandolin
Eddie Adcock - banjo, baritone vocals
Alan O'Bryant - banjo, tenor vocals
Lightning Chance - bass, bass vocals
Andy Statman - mandolin
Triona Ni Dhomhnaill - keyboards, clavinet

Production
Producer: Peter Rowan/Hiroshi Asada/Richard Greene/Jim Rooney
Recording Engineer: Hiroshi Gotoh/Richard Greene/Neil Wilburn
Mixing: Hiroshi Gotoh/Richard Greene
Cover Design: Raymond Simone
Photography: Michael Maggid

References

Peter Rowan albums
1982 albums
Sugar Hill Records albums